Alison E. Cooley is a British classicist specialising in Latin epigraphy. She is a professor at the University of Warwick and former head of its Department of Classics and Ancient History. In 2004, she was awarded The Butterworth Memorial Teaching Award.

Writing
Cooley has published widely on epigraphy as well as organising conferences on the topic. Bohdan Chernyukh, writing in Censurae Librorum, praised the "meticulous analysis and description of the inscriptions" in Cooley's Cambridge Manual of Latin Epigraphy (2012). The Bryn Mawr Classical Review said of the second edition (2014) of her sourcebook on Pompeii and Herculaneum that it was "an essential resource for anyone researching or teaching about Pompeii".

Selected publications
Pompeii: A Sourcebook, Routledge, London, 2004. (with M.G.L. Cooley) (Second edition 2014 as Pompeii and Herculaneum: A Sourcebook)
Res Gestae divi Augusti, edition with introduction, translation, and commentary. Cambridge University Press, Cambridge, 2009.
"History and Inscriptions, Rome" in The Oxford History of Historical Writing, Vol. 1, eds. A. Feldherr & G. Hardy. Oxford University Press, Oxford, 2011, pp. 244–64.
The Cambridge Manual of Latin Epigraphy, Cambridge University Press, Cambridge, 2012.

References

Living people
Academics of the University of Warwick
Year of birth missing (living people)
Alumni of St John's College, Oxford